Dragonstone may also refer to:
  - a precious stone reputed to be found in serpents, according to classical writers
 Dragonstone (A Song of Ice and Fire), a fictional fortress and island
 "Dragonstone" (Game of Thrones), an episode of the seventh season of Game of Thrones
 Dragonstone Software, developer of the 2002 video game Dragon's Lair 3D: Return to the Lair
 Dragon Stone of Dash Kasan Caves, a fourteenth-century temple in Iran
 Dragonstone (video game), 1994 role-playing video game
 Drakenstein (archaic Dutch for dragonstone), a range of mountains in the Western Cape province of South Africa
 The Dragonstone, a 1996 novel in the Mithras series by Dennis L. McKiernan